Jorge Luis Luna (born December 14, 1986) is an Argentine footballer who currently plays for Deportes Copiapó.

References
 
 

1986 births
Living people
Argentine footballers
Argentine expatriate footballers
Santiago Wanderers footballers
Deportivo Armenio footballers
San Martín de San Juan footballers
Estudiantes de La Plata footballers
Gimnasia y Esgrima de Jujuy footballers
Universidad de Concepción footballers
Cobreloa footballers
Chilean Primera División players
Primera B de Chile players
Argentine Primera División players
Expatriate footballers in Chile
Association football midfielders
Footballers from Buenos Aires